James Dunlap was the second president of Jefferson College from 1803 to 1811.  Dunlap was born in Chester County, Pennsylvania, in 1744.  He was a graduate of the College of New Jersey  (now Princeton University) and was reputed to have excelled as a teacher of languages.  During his presidency, Jefferson College was approached in 1807 by the Washington College Board to appoint committees for the purpose of devising a plan for the union of the two institutions.  This attempt failed due to disagreement over selecting a site for the united institution.  Dunlap resigned his presidency on April 25, 1811.  He died in Abingdon, Pennsylvania, on November 22, 1818.

References

1744 births
1818 deaths
Presidents of Washington & Jefferson College
Princeton University alumni
People from Chester County, Pennsylvania